Utopians is a 2015 film by the Hong Kong film-maker Scud, the production-crediting name of Danny Cheng Wan-Cheung. It is the story of a university student who becomes deeply attracted to his (male) professor, and whose life changes as a result. The film received its world premiere on 31 October 2015 at the New Directors Film Festival in Japan. Utopians explores several themes traditionally regarded as 'taboo' in Hong Kong society and features full-frontal male nudity in several scenes. It is the sixth of seven publicly released films by Scud. The six other films are: City Without Baseball in 2008, Permanent Residence in 2009, Amphetamine in 2010, Love Actually... Sucks! in 2011, Voyage in 2013 and Thirty Years of Adonis (which features footage from Utopians) in 2017. The eighth film, Apostles, was made in 2022, as was the ninth, Bodyshop, but neither have yet been released. The tenth and final film, Naked Nations: Hong Kong Tribe, is currently in production. Utopians includes a scene in which the main character, played by mainland China actor Adonis He Fei, is shown completely naked stroking his erect private parts as he sighs with pleasure until he shoots his semen in the uncut version of the film.

Plot
Utopians is a coming-of-age story about a young student, Hins Gao (Adonis He Fei), who unexpectedly finds himself deeply attracted to his male professor, Antonio Ming (Jackie Chow). Despite having had a conservative upbringing, Hins wants to get close enough to Ming to understand him. The experience transforms his life and comes to define his adult identity. The story is described as a "visually stunning paean to open love and pan-sexuality freely blending straightforward narrative and fantasy elements".

Production
The film's director, Scud, says that he drew inspiration for the film from the writings of Plato and the culture of Ancient Greece, which he describes as the "best era of mankind" when being gay was mainstream, and that "the dream of a utopian life" is one where education "serves to enhance love instead of forbid it", and that this became clear to him ever since he was aware of the sexual alternatives available.

Scud says that he fell into depression after making his fifth film, Voyage, and was considering ending his career. But one day a 19-year-old boy came to him and talked about his story of having fallen in love with a policeman, and about a Japanese writer whose work Scud had read extensively when he was younger. He felt his next film should pay tribute to the period of enlightenment brought about by great philosophers and artists.
   
Scud says that Utopians took only weeks to write and shoot. He also experimented with a more "democratic" method of film-making by consulting the cast on the roles they most preferred to take and encouraging them to resolve matters among themselves, much like the situation in ancient times.

Casting was conducted openly in Hong Kong, Taiwan and Singapore, with over 300 attending in Hong Kong on a particularly stormy day. The film's leading man, Adonis He Fei, is an actor from mainland China. His agent provided a resume so that He could fit Utopians into his busy filming schedule.

Main cast
 Adonis He Fei ... Hins Gao
 Jackie Chow ... Professor Antonio Ming
 Ching-Man Chin ... Swan (credited as 'Moe Chin')
 Fiona Wang ... Joey
 Jie Shui ... Mother
 Ben Fu Wai Bun... Dean
 William Lo ... Boy on boat trip / Bonfire Boy
 Jung Jen Pao ... Boy on boat trip / Bonfire Boy
 Eric Cheng ... Father
 Yeung Man Lok ... Baby Hins

Languages

In the movie four languages are spoken: Mandarin, Cantonese, 
Japanese and English. Even though much of the film is centered around Hong Kong, the main characters speak Mandarin-Chinese among each other, e.g. Hins, his mother, his girlfriend and Ming. The other languages are spoken in much shorter segments. This multitude of languages is also reflected in the transcription of the Chinese characters of the title given by the producer which is Cantonese and reads tung lau hap woo, whereas one would expect a transcription in Mandarin pinyin for such a mostly Mandarin spoken movie which would be tóng liú hé wū.

See also
 List of Hong Kong films of 2015
 List of lesbian, gay, bisexual or transgender-related films
 List of lesbian, gay, bisexual, or transgender-related films by storyline
 Nudity in film (East Asian cinema since 1929)

References

External links

2015 drama films
2015 LGBT-related films
2015 films
2010s Cantonese-language films
Chinese independent films
Chinese-language films
Chinese LGBT-related films
Films directed by Scud (filmmaker)
Films set in Hong Kong
Gay-related films
Hong Kong independent films
Hong Kong LGBT-related films
LGBT-related drama films
Male bisexuality in film
2010s Mandarin-language films
Taiwanese LGBT-related films
Utopian films
Magic realism films
2010s Hong Kong films